Small Claims: The Reunion is an Australian television film starring Rebecca Gibney and Claudia Karvan, which first aired on Network Ten in 2006. The film was a co-production with subscription television and was also broadcast on the Foxtel, Austar, and Optus Television Subscription Television services.  The series was written by husband and wife team, Keith Thompson and Kaye Bendle.

The film is part three of a mystery series about two overworked young mums, de-skilled beyond their worst nightmares, who become a formidable pair of sleuths, directed by Cherie Nowlan. Their cases are the murders, greed and dark passions that lurk behind the anonymous facade of the suburbs.

Cast
 Rebecca Gibney, as Chrissy Hindmarsh
 Claudia Karvan, as Jo Collins
 Lisa Chappell, as Louise Page
 Simon Burke, as Jon
 Alison Whyte, as Pip
 Maggie Dence, as Roma
 Peter Phelps, as Paul Loyd
 Emma Booth, as Annie
 Steve Vidler, as Ross Page
 Daisy Betts, as Amber
 Gyton Grantley, as Detective Senior Constable Brett
 Wayne Blair, as Detective Senior Constable Lacey

See also
 Australian films of 2004
 Cinema of Australia
 List of films shot in Sydney
 List of Australian films

References

External links
 
Australian Television Archive
 Essential Viewing Website

Network 10 original programming
Australian drama television series
Films directed by Tony Tilse
2000s English-language films